Philip or Phil Smith may refer to:

In sport
Phil Smith (Australian footballer) (1946–2010), Australian rules player
Phil Smith (basketball) (1952–2002), American basketball player
Philip Smith (footballer, born 1885) (1885–1918), English football player for Chelsea and Burnley
Phil Smith (footballer, born 1979), English football goalkeeper for Swindon, Portsmouth and Aldershot

In entertainment
Phil Smith, guitarist for The Lovin' Spoonful
Philip Smith (musician) (born 1952), American trumpeter
Philip Smith (producer), New Zealand film and television producer and writer

In politics
Phil Smith (Alabama politician) (1931-2020), American businessman, lawyer, and politician
Phil Smith (Australian politician) (born 1938), Australian politician and teacher
Philip Smith, Baron Smith of Hindhead (born 1966), Conservative member of the British House of Lords
Philip Smith (Northern Ireland politician) (born 1967), member of the Northern Ireland Assembly

In the military
Philip Smith (British Army officer) (died 1894)
Philip Smith (VC) (1829–1906), Irish recipient of the Victoria Cross
Philip E. Smith (born 1934), U.S. Air Force fighter pilot
Philip F. Smith (1932–2017), Master Chief Petty Officer of the U.S. Coast Guard

In science
Philip Edward Smith (1884–1970), American endocrinologist
Phillip Hagar Smith (1905–1987), American electrical engineer
Philip Hubert Smith (1906–1969), British automotive engineer and technical author
Philip Sidney Smith (1877-1949), American geologist

Other
Philip Smith (criminal) (born 1965), British spree killer
Philip Smith (theater owner) (died 1961), American theater owner
Philip Smith (born 1988), founder of the Friends of the British Overseas Territories
Philip A. Smith (1933–2007), president of Providence College 1994–2005 
Philip Alan Smith (1920–2010), bishop of New Hampshire in the Episcopal Church
Phillip K. Smith III, American artist
Philip S. Smith, American entrepreneur